San Marino is scheduled to compete at the 2019 European Games in Minsk from 21 to 30 June 2019. San Marino is represented by 4 athletes in 3 sports.

Competitors

Medalists 

| width="78%" align="left" valign="top" |

Archery

Recurve

Shooting

Men

Women

Mixed team

Wrestling

Men's Freestyle

References 

Nations at the 2019 European Games
European Games
2019